Amine Gülşe Özil (born 30 April 1993) is a Turkish-Swedish actress, model and beauty pageant titleholder born and raised in Sweden. She was crowned Miss Turkey 2014 and represented her country at the Miss World 2014 pageant.

Life and career
Amine Gülşe was born and raised in Gothenburg, Sweden. Her mother is from İzmir, Turkey, and her father is an Iraqi Turkmen from Kirkuk, Iraq and she has a brother named Şahan Gülşe. She graduated from the International High School of the Gothenburg Region in 2012.

She relocated to Istanbul to work as an actress and a model.  She starred in the 2015 Turkish television series Asla Vazgeçmem. In 2017 Amine began dating footballer Mesut Özil. Her engagement to German footballer Mesut Özil was announced in January 2019. The couple married on 7 June 2019. Turkish President Recep Tayyip Erdoğan was the witness. In March 2020, the couple confirmed the birth of their first child, a daughter named Eda. Their second daughter, named Ela, was born in September 2022.

Pageantry

Miss Turkey 2014
Gülşe won Miss Turkey 2014 and was crowned as Miss World Turkey. After a year she crowned Ecem Cirpan as her successor.

Miss World 2014
Amine competed at Miss World 2014 but did not place in the finals.

Filmography

References

1993 births
21st-century Turkish actresses
Living people
Miss World 2014 delegates
Actresses from İzmir
Turkish beauty pageant winners
Turkish female models
Swedish actresses
Swedish female models
Association footballers' wives and girlfriends
Swedish people of Turkish descent
Turkish people of Iraqi Turkmen descent
Iraqi Turkmen people
Swedish emigrants to Turkey